The Vicariate Apostolic of Puerto Carreño in the Catholic Church is located in the city of Puerto Carreño in Colombia.

History
On 22 December 1999 Blessed John Paul II established the Vicariate Apostolic of Puerto Carreño when the Prefecture Apostolic of Vichada was suppressed.

Ordinaries
Alvaro Efrén Rincón Rojas, C.Ss.R. (22 Dec 1999 – 10 Jun 2010) Resigned
Francisco Antonio Ceballos Escobar, C.Ss.R. (10 Jun 2010 – 22 Apr 2020) Appointed Bishop of Riohacha

See also
Roman Catholicism in Colombia

Sources

Apostolic vicariates
Roman Catholic dioceses in Colombia
Christian organizations established in 1999
1999 establishments in Colombia